XLFM (formerly 2XL) is an Australian radio station serving the Cooma region owned by Capital Radio Network. It was opened in August 1937.

The station was originally broadcasting from Cooma on 918 kHz AM under the callsign '2XL' before undergoing an FM conversion in 2019. Coinciding with the move to FM, 2XL re-branded to XLFM.

XLFM is a part of the regional 'Forever Classic' network of Capital Radio Network Stations and acts as its programming hub.

Transmitter and studios
XLFM has numerous transmitter locations repeating the broadcast on 96.1 FM. The repeater transmitters are found in Jindabyne, Thredbo, Charlotte Pass, Perisher Valley & Bombala. The studio location has over the years changed from Cooma to Jindabyne which is its current location of Kosciuszko Road Jindabyne. The Jindabyne studios are shared with its sister station Snow FM.

Announcers
Gary Warne
Ray Hadley
Macka Dixon
Trent McCurdy

References

External links
 XLFM Website
 Capital Radio Network Website

Radio stations in New South Wales
Radio stations established in 1937
Classic hits radio stations in Australia
Capital Radio Network
Cooma